The International Journal of Algebra and Computation is published by World Scientific, and contains articles on general mathematics, as well as:

 Combinatorial group theory and semigroup theory
 Universal algebra
 Algorithmic and computational problems in algebra
 Theory of automata
 Formal language theory
 Theory of computation
 Theoretical computer science
According to the Journal Citation Reports, the journal has a 2020 impact factor of 0.719.

Abstracting and indexing 
The journal is indexed in:
 ISI Alerting Services
 CompuMath Citation Index
 Science Citation Index
 Current Contents/Physical, Chemical and Earth Sciences
 Mathematical Reviews
 INSPEC
 Zentralblatt MATH
 Computer Abstracts

Mathematics journals
Publications established in 1991
World Scientific academic journals
English-language journals